Love Is in the Hair is a 2016 Nigerian romantic-comedy film produced by Emem Isong and directed by Ansa Kpokpogri.

Cast
Uti Nwachukwu
Funny Bone
Okey Bakassi
Ime Bishop Umoh
Toyin Aimakhu 
Funky Mallam
Vani Vyas
Micheal Bassey
Omotu Bissong
Emem Ufot
Obioma Beulah
Sonamm Sharma
Avijit Dutt

References

English-language Nigerian films
Nigerian romantic comedy films
2016 films
2016 romantic comedy films
2010s English-language films